was a Japanese politician, member of the Liberal Democratic Party. He was Minister of Foreign Affairs from 1986 to 1987. He was a close confidant of Nakasone, who appointed him Foreign Minister after his 1986 re-election.  Kuranari had concentrated on agricultural issues and was director of the Economic Planning Agency, a Cabinet post, in the 1970s.   In 1987 he visited Sri Lanka, Fiji and other countries.

Honour

Foreign honour
  : Honorary Commander of the Order of the Defender of the Realm (P.M.N.) (1991)

See also 
 List of Japanese politicians
 Politics of Japan

References 

|-

|-

|-

|-

|-

1918 births
1996 deaths
People from Nagasaki
University of Tokyo alumni
Members of the House of Representatives (Japan)
Government ministers of Japan
Foreign ministers of Japan
Liberal Democratic Party (Japan) politicians